"Lash Out" is a song by Alice Merton.

Lash Out may also refer to:  
 Lash Out, a Norwegian band featuring Andy LaPlegua
 "Lash Out", an episode of The Spies featuring Michael Forrest

See also 
 Lash (disambiguation)